A Soldier's Story is a 1984 American mystery drama film directed and produced by Norman Jewison, adapted by Charles Fuller from his Pulitzer Prize-winning A Soldier's Play.  Fuller had said Herman Melville's novella Billy Budd inspired the play. It is a story about racism in a segregated regiment of the U.S Army commanded by White officers and training in the Jim Crow South, in a time and place where a Black officer is unprecedented and bitterly resented by nearly everyone, and follows a Black JAG officer sent to investigate the murder of a Black sergeant in Louisiana near the end of World War II.

The cast, composed primarily of Black actors, is led by Howard E. Rollins Jr. and Adolph Caesar (whose performance was nominated for a Best Supporting Actor Oscar). Other actors include Art Evans, David Alan Grier, Larry Riley, David Harris, Robert Townsend, Bob Swanson, and Patti LaBelle. Denzel Washington, still at the beginning of his career, appears in a supporting role. Several actors reprise their roles from the stage version.

The film was first shown at the Toronto International Film Festival. It won the New York Drama Critics Award, the Outer Critics Circle Award, the Theater Club Award, and three Village Voice Obie Awards. It won the Golden Prize at the 14th Moscow International Film Festival. It was also nominated for three Academy Awards: for Best Picture, Supporting Actor (Adolph Caesar), and Screenplay Adaptation (Fuller).

Plot
In 1944 during World War II, Vernon Waters, a master sergeant in a company of Black soldiers, is shot to death with a .45 caliber pistol outside Fort Neal, a segregated Army base in Louisiana.  Captain Richard Davenport, a Black officer from the Judge Advocate General's Corps, is sent to investigate, against the wishes of commanding officer Colonel Nivens. Most assume Waters was killed by the local Ku Klux Klan, but others are doubtful.

Nivens gives Davenport three days to conduct his investigation. Even Captain Taylor, the only White officer in favor of a full investigation, is uncooperative and patronizing, fearing a Black officer will have little success. While some Black soldiers are proud to see one of their own wearing captain's bars, others are distrustful and evasive.

Davenport learns that Waters' company was officially part of the 221st Chemical Smoke Generator Battalion.  Though eager to serve their country, they are assigned menial jobs in deference to their white counterparts. Most are former players from the Negro baseball league, grouped as a unit to play ball with Waters as manager. Their success against white soldiers gives them a good deal of popularity, with talk of an exhibition game against the New York Yankees.

James Wilkie, a fellow sergeant Waters demoted for being drunk on duty, initially describes Waters as a strict disciplinarian, but also a fair, good-natured NCO who got on well with the men, especially the jovial and well-liked C.J. Memphis. Davenport uncovers Waters' true tyrannical nature and his disgust with fellow Black soldiers, particularly those from the rural South.

Private Peterson reveals he stood up to Waters when he berated the men after a winning game. Waters challenged Peterson to a fight and beat him badly. Interviewing other soldiers, Davenport learns that Waters charged C.J. with the murder of a white MP, after a search conducted by Wilkie turned up a recently discharged pistol under C.J.'s bunk. Waters provoked C.J. into striking him, whereupon the weapons charge was dismissed and C.J. was charged with striking a superior officer.

When C.J.'s best friend Corporal Cobb visits him in jail, C.J. is suffering from intense claustrophobia and tells Cobb of a visit from Waters, who admitted it was a set-up Waters had done to others. Davenport learns from Cobb that C.J., awaiting trial, hanged himself. In protest, the platoon deliberately lost the season's last game, and Waters was shaken by the suicide. Taylor disbanded the team, and the players were assigned to the 221st.

Davenport learns that white officers Captain Wilcox and Lieutenant Byrd had an altercation with Waters shortly before his death. Both officers admit to assaulting Waters when he confronted them in a drunken tirade, but deny killing him as they had not been issued .45 ammunition. Though Taylor is convinced Wilcox and Byrd are lying, Davenport releases them.

Privates Peterson and Smalls go AWOL, and Davenport forces Wilkie to admit he planted the gun under C.J.'s bunk on Waters' orders. Waters had divulged his internalized racism to Wilkie, revealing that during World War I, he helped lynch a Black soldier who acted as an Uncle Tom to French civilians. Before the lynching victims antics some of the white French women had been willing to go with them on dates.  Davenport asks why Waters did not target Peterson because of their fight, and Wilkie explains that Waters liked and respected Peterson, because Peterson stood up for himself. Davenport has Wilkie arrested just as an impromptu celebration begins, as the platoon is to be shipped out to join the fight overseas.

Realizing Peterson and Smalls were on guard duty the night of Waters' murder, and thus had been issued .45 ammunition for their pistols, Davenport interrogates Smalls, found by the MPs. Smalls confesses Peterson killed Sergeant Waters, as revenge for C.J.'s death. Captured and brought to the interrogation room, Peterson confesses to the murder, saying "I didn't kill much. Some things need getting rid of”, to which Davenport retorts “Who gave you the right to judge who is fit to be a Negro?”

Taylor congratulates Davenport, admitting that he will have to get used to Negroes being in charge. Davenport assures Taylor that he will get used to it – "You can bet your ass on that," he adds, as the platoon marches in preparation for their deployment to the European theatre.

Cast

 Howard E. Rollins Jr. as Cpt. Richard Davenport
 Adolph Caesar as Sgt. Vernon Waters
 Art Evans as Pvt. Wilkie
 David Alan Grier as Cpl. Cobb
 David Harris as Pvt. Smalls
 Denzel Washington as Pfc. Peterson
 Dennis Lipscomb as Capt. Taylor
 Larry Riley as C.J. Memphis
 Robert Townsend as Cpl. Ellis
 William Allen Young as Pvt. Henson
 John Hancock as Sgt. Washington
 Patti LaBelle as Big Mary
 Trey Wilson as Col. Nivens
 Wings Hauser as Lt. Byrd
 Scott Paulin as Cpt. Wilcox
 Mike Williams as Pfc. Oscar

Production

Jewison and many of the cast members worked for scale or less under a tight budget with Columbia Pictures. "No one really wanted to make this movie... a black story, it was based on World War II, and those themes were not popular at the box office", according to Jewison. Warner Bros. turned it down, as did Universal and Metro-Goldwyn-Mayer. Columbia's Frank Price read the screenplay and was deeply interested, but the studio was hesitant about its commercial value, so Jewison offered to do the film for a $5 million budget and no salary. When the Directors Guild of America insisted he must have a fee, he agreed to take the lowest possible amount. The film ended up grossing $22.1 million.

Howard E. Rollins, Jr. had just received an Oscar nomination for his role in Ragtime and was cast as the lead. Most of the cast came from Broadway careers, but only Adolph Caesar, Denzel Washington, Larry Riley and William Allen Young appeared in both the movie and the original off-Broadway play with the Negro Ensemble Company in the New York City version.

A Soldier's Story was shot entirely in Arkansas. The "Tynin" exterior scenes were shot in three days in Clarendon. The baseball sequence was filmed in Little Rock at the historic Lamar Porter Field.

Bill Clinton (then Governor of Arkansas) dropped by during the shooting. He became very enthused about the project and later helped by providing the Arkansas Army National Guard in full regalia for a grand scene, since Jewison could not afford to pay an army of extras. Production was completed with their help at Fort Chaffee United States Army Ready Reserve base at Fort Smith.

Reception
The film holds a 92% rating on Rotten Tomatoes from a sample of 20 critics. The site's consensus reads, "A meticulously crafted murder mystery with incisive observations about race in America, A Soldier's Story benefits from a roundly excellent ensemble and Charles Fuller's politically urgent screenplay".

Accolades
 Academy Award for Best Picture (Nominated)
 Academy Award for Best Adapted Screenplay – Charles Fuller (Nominated)
 Academy Award for Best Supporting Actor – Adolph Caesar (Nominated)
 Directors Guild of America Award for Outstanding Directorial Achievement in Motion Pictures – Norman Jewison (Nominated)
 Edgar Award, Best Motion Picture Screenplay – Charles Fuller (Won)
 Golden Globe Award for Best Motion Picture - Drama (Nominated)
 Golden Globe Award for Best Screenplay - Motion Picture – Charles Fuller (Nominated)
 Golden Globe Award Best Actor in a Supporting Role in a Motion Picture – Adolph Caesar (Nominated)
 Los Angeles Film Critics Association Awards, Best Supporting Actor – Adolph Caesar (Won)
 14th Moscow International Film Festival – Golden Prize (Won)
 NAACP Image Award for Outstanding Motion Picture (Won)
 Writers Guild of America for Best Screenplay Based on Material from Another Medium – Charles Fuller (Nominated)

References

External links
 
 
 
 
 

1984 films
1984 drama films
1980s mystery films
African-American drama films
African-American films
American films based on plays
American mystery films
Columbia Pictures films
Edgar Award-winning works
1980s English-language films
Films about race and ethnicity
Films about racism in the United States
Films about the United States Army
Films directed by Norman Jewison
Films scored by Herbie Hancock
Films set in 1944
Films set in Louisiana
Films set on the home front during World War II
Films shot in Arkansas
American World War II films
1980s American films